Dul-e Masum (also Romanized as Dūl-e Ma‘sūm and Dūl Ma‘sūm) is a village in Jalalvand Rural District, Firuzabad District, Kermanshah County, Kermanshah Province, Iran. At the 2006 census, its population was 49, in 10 families.

References 

Populated places in Kermanshah County